Edge Radio (call sign: 7EDG) is a community radio station situated in the Australian city of Hobart. It is a youth oriented station, with most of its presenters under the age of thirty.

Edge Radio focuses on local music, running a Tasmanian music show weekly. The studio is located in the University of Tasmania's Hobart campus.

External links
Edge Radio

	

Radio stations in Hobart
Community radio stations in Australia